Estadio Arquitecto Ricardo Etcheverri, formerly known as Estadio Ferro Carril Oeste, is a stadium located in the Caballito district of Buenos Aires. It is the home venue of Club Ferro Carril Oeste. The stadium, opened in 1905 and located close to Caballito station of Sarmiento Line, has a current capacity of 24,442.

Inaugurated on 2 January 1905, Ferro Carril Oeste is the oldest football stadium of Argentina (referring to clubs affiliated to AFA) and the second in South America after Estadio Gran Parque Central (home venue of Uruguayan Club Nacional de Football, built in 1900).

Because of being located near the geographic centre of Buenos Aires, several former clubs used it as their home venues. Some of them were Alumni, Barracas AC, San Lorenzo, Argentinos Juniors, among others.

The stadium also hosted test matches played by the Argentina national rugby union team (Los Pumas) during the 1970s to early 2000s, where Argentina played Ireland, New Zealand, France and Australia among others. In Ferro Carril Oeste, Argentina achieved notable wins over Australia (1979) and France (1985), and a celebrated 21–21 tie vs the All Blacks in 1985.

History 
The stadium was built on a land granted by the manager of Buenos Aires Western Railway in 1905. That same year the first wooden grandstand was built. The first official match was played here on 21 April 1907, when Ferro C. Oeste and Plate tied 2–2. In 1906, the first official grandstand (with roof) was built. Due to being linked with the Western Railway company, the club hosted several sports activities in 1907 to celebrate the 50th. anniversary of first railway line in Argentina.

The first notable event hosted by the stadium was the 1907 Tie Cup Final where Alumni defeated Uruguayan side CURCC 3–1. As Alumni did not have own venue, the team played its home matches at Ferro C. Oeste between 1907 and 1909. In 1914, Ferro hosted a Tie Cup final again, when River Plate beat Bristol and won their first international title. Although Ferro C. Oeste played in the Second Division, its stadium was a frequent venue for several Primera División matches by other teams. 

When the Flores Athletic Club disbanded in 1907, Ferro Carril Oeste acquired some of its facilities such as tennis and paleta courts. In September 1931, the official grandstand was completely destroyed by fire, but was rebuilt. During the 1930s, the club got materials in change for football players. Some transfers made that way were Federici to Huracán and Arcadio López to Boca Juniors. In this case, the club received a whole wooden grandstand that had been part of the old Boca Juniors stadium. Two years later, Boca Juniors opened La Bombonera, made of concrete. The wooden grandstand was located on Martín de Gainza street. 

The Ferro Carril Oeste stadium hosted international rugby matches for the first time in 1932, when the Junior Springboks toured on Argentina playing several games there including two test-matches v the Argentina national team. 

From the 1940s to the 1960s, Ferro Carril Oeste hosted several racing events that include midget car and motorcycle races. Those events were scheduled on Saturdays so football matches were on Sundays, taking place on the racetrack surrounding the football pitch.

In 1951 Ferro Carril Oeste was one of the venues (along with Gimnasia y Esgrima) to host the South American Rugby Championship in Buenos Aires. In 1970, the club built a gymnasium under the official grandstand, which was inaugurated in 1972.

Apart from football games, Ferro C.O. would be the home venue for Los Pumas matches until 1985, when New Zealand toured in the country. The last test played by Argentina at the stadium was the historic 21–21 v the All Blacks in November, when captain Hugo Porta scored all the points for Argentina. He would be named "the best fly-half of the world" at the end of that year.

During the 1990s, the stadium returned to host rugby matches of Los Pumas, along with José Amalfitani Stadium. The last test played by the national team at Ferro was in 2001, when Argentina defeated Italy.

Concerts 

Since the 1980s the Estadio Ferro Carril Oeste has hosted a large amount of artists performing there, mostly rock bands.

Local rockstar Charly García gave his first concert as soloist there in 1982, with an attendance of 25,000 people.

The first international artist to have performed at Ferro was British band The Cure in 1987, in a chaotic concert that finished in a riot where hooligans and policemen fight inside and outside the stadium. During the following years, several artists performed in the stadium, having hosted three editions of the Monsters of Rock metal festival, in 1995, 1997 and 2005.

Some of the most notable local bands performing at Ferro were Riff, Rata Blanca, Soda Stereo and Los Fabulosos Cadillacs.

References

External links

 
 Photos at worldstadiums.com
 Aerial photo at Google Earth

S
F
F
F
F
F
F
1905 establishments in Argentina